Bradley Fleming (born 26 January 1976 in Tauranga) is a rugby union footballer from New Zealand, who plays in the wing position. He won a gold medal as part of the New Zealand sevens rugby team at the 2002 Commonwealth Games.

References

External links 
 

1976 births
Living people
New Zealand rugby union players
Highlanders (rugby union) players
Rugby union players from Tauranga
Commonwealth Games gold medallists for New Zealand
Rugby sevens players at the 2002 Commonwealth Games
Commonwealth Games rugby sevens players of New Zealand
New Zealand international rugby sevens players
Commonwealth Games medallists in rugby sevens
Medallists at the 2002 Commonwealth Games